KMCO 101.3 FM is a radio station licensed to McAlester, Oklahoma / Wilburton, Oklahoma. The station broadcasts a country music format and is owned by Southeastern Oklahoma Radio, LLC.

References

External links
KMCO's website

MCO
Country radio stations in the United States